New Barnet Congregational Church is a church that once stood on the corner of Station Road and Plantagenet Road in New Barnet, London. The church was designed by John Sulman and opened in April 1880.

In 1963, it merged with the nearby St Augustine's Presbyterian Church in Mowbray Road. It closed on Easter Sunday of 1967, after which the site was sold and used for a housing development. The funds that were raised from the sale of the site contributed to the redevelopment of the St Augustine's Presbyterian Church site, which later became the St John's United Reformed Church.

See also
Baptist Church, New Barnet

References 

Churches in the London Borough of Barnet
New Barnet
Churches completed in 1880